Pamula Pushpa Sreevani is an Indian politician who served as the 11th deputy Chief Minister and minister of Tribal Welfare Department of Andhra Pradesh from 8 June 2019 to 7 April 2022. She is a Member of the Andhra Pradesh Legislative Assembly from Kurupam constituency. She is member of the YSR Congress Party.

In June 2019, she became one of the five Deputy Chief Ministers of Andhra Pradesh in the Y. S. Jaganmohan Reddy led cabinet and was also given a charge of Minister of Tribal Welfare.

Her TikTok video on YS Jagan went viral.

Assembly Elections 2014

Assembly Elections 2019

References 

Andhra Pradesh MLAs 2014–2019
People from Vizianagaram district
YSR Congress Party politicians
Members of the Andhra Pradesh Legislative Council
Living people
1987 births
Indian National Congress politicians
Andhra Pradesh MLAs 2019–2024
Deputy Chief Ministers of Andhra Pradesh
Women deputy chief ministers of Indian states
21st-century Indian women politicians